Corofin ( or Coradh Finne) is a large village on the River Fergus in northern County Clare, Ireland and also a parish of the same name in the  Catholic Diocese of Killaloe.

The 2016 population was 776, up from 689 in 2011.

Name
Topographical Poem] A different translation is "Finne's weir".

The village is sometimes spelled "Corrofin". Corofin also styles itself as "The Gateway to the Burren" or "The Angler's Paradise".

Geography
It is on the southern edge of the upland limestone region of The Burren. Corofin is in the civil parish of Kilnaboy in the Barony of Inchiquin. It lies across the townlands of Baunkyle, Laghtagoona and Kilvoydan.

It lies in the Kilnaboy parish of the Roman Catholic Diocese of Killaloe. The parish has three churches, St Brigid's in Corofin, St Joseph's in Kilnaboy and St Mary's in Rath.

Places of interest
On Church Street is the former Church of Ireland, St. Catherine's Church, built between 1715 and 1720 by Catherine Kneightly. It was renovated c. 1820 and by 1829 the steeple had been added. The building is now in use by the Clare Heritage and Genealogical Research Centre.

Inchiquin Castle is located a few kilometers from Corfin, on the north side of Lake Inchiquin. It was possibly built by Teige-an-Chomhaid O'Brien (d. 1466). In 1542, it belonged to Turlough, son of Murrough, first Baron of Inchiquin. Murrough O'Brien, the fourth Baron, was in possession in 1580. During the Nine Years' War it was attacked, and towards the end of the 17th century it was abandoned. Today the castle is a ruin surrounded by pastures. Part of the older castle tower is still extant as is a portion of the later 17th-century banquet hall.

Town twinning
Corofin is twinned with Tonquédec in France.

Notable people
 Chartres Brew, 19th century Gold commissioner, Chief Constable and judge in the Colony of British Columbia
 Frederick William Burton, 19th-century painter and director of the National Gallery, London
 Tony Killeen, (born 1952), Fianna Fáil politician, former Teachta Dála (TD) for the Clare constituency and Minister for Defence
 Benjamin Lucas, soldier of the 17th century
 Gerry Quinn, Hurling left-wing back (born 1980)

See also
List of towns and villages in Ireland
O'Dea Castle
Battle of Dysert O'Dea

References

Sources
 Michael Mac Mahon, The Parish of Corofin: A Historical Profile, .

External links
 Corofin on Clare Library Website
 Clare Heritage and Genealogical Research Centre
 Burren National Park information point

Towns and villages in County Clare
Parishes of the Roman Catholic Diocese of Killaloe